The men's 60 metres event  at the 1987 IAAF World Indoor Championships was held at the Hoosier Dome in Indianapolis on 6 and 7 March.

Medalists

Note: Ben Johnson of  originally won the gold medal in a world record time of 6.41, but he was disqualified in September 1989 after he admitted to steroid use between 1981 and 1988.

Results

Heats
The first 2 of each heat (Q) and next 4 fastest (q) qualified for the semifinals.

Semifinals
First 4 of each semifinal (Q) qualified directly for the final.

Final

References

60
60 metres at the World Athletics Indoor Championships